Jefferson Ochoa Fernández (born 9 November 1996) is a Colombian taekwondo practitioner.

In 2019, he competed in the men's flyweight at the World Taekwondo Championships held in Manchester, United Kingdom.

He qualified at the 2020 Pan American Taekwondo Olympic Qualification Tournament in Heredia, Costa Rica to represent Colombia at the 2020 Summer Olympics in Tokyo, Japan. He competed in the men's 58 kg event where he was eliminated in his first match.

In 2021, he won the silver medal in the men's 58 kg event at the Pan American Taekwondo Championships held in Cancún, Mexico.

References

External links 
 

Living people
1996 births
Colombian male taekwondo practitioners
Taekwondo practitioners at the 2020 Summer Olympics
Olympic taekwondo practitioners of Colombia
People from Santa Marta
Sportspeople from Magdalena Department
21st-century Colombian people
Competitors at the 2022 South American Games
South American Games medalists in taekwondo
South American Games bronze medalists for Colombia